Tamir Gonen (born 1975) is an American structural biochemist and membrane biophysicist best known for his contributions to structural biology of membrane proteins, membrane biochemistry and electron cryo-microscopy (cryoEM) particularly in electron crystallography of 2D crystals and for the development of 3D electron crystallography from microscopic crystals known as MicroED. Gonen is an Investigator of the Howard Hughes Medical Institute, a professor at the University of California, Los Angeles, the founding director of the MicroED Imaging Center at UCLA and a Member of the Royal Society of New Zealand.

Education 
Gonen attended the University of Auckland in New Zealand and graduated with a Bachelor of Science double major in Inorganic Chemistry and Biological Sciences, followed by First Class Honors in Biological Sciences in 1998. He then obtained a Doctor of Philosophy in Biological Science in 2002 from the University of Auckland for research with by Edward N. Baker and Joerg Kistler. Postdoctoral education was conducted at Harvard Medical School at the laboratory of Thomas Walz.

Research 
Gonen's current research focuses on the structures and functions of medically important membrane proteins that are involved in homeostasis and method development in cryoEM, namely microcrystal electron diffraction (microED). He published the first atomic resolution structure determined by cryoEM detailing the structure of aquaporin-0 at 1.9Å resolution.

Development of microcrystal electron diffraction 

The Gonen laboratory spearheaded the use of electron diffraction for the determination of protein structure from 3D nano crystals in a frozen hydrated state. The method termed microED was established in 2013 with a proof of principle paper published in eLife. In 2014  continuous rotation MicroED was established and demonstrated. In 2015 the first novel structure was determined by MicroED for the protein alpha-synuclein at 1.4Å resolution in collaboration with David Eisenberg and in 2016 microED yielded 1Å resolution data from protein nanocrystals where the phase could be solved ab initio. MicroED has been used for drug discovery, determination of membrane proteins such as ion channels materials and small organic molecules studied in a frozen hydrated state and extended to sub atomic resolution better than 0.8Å.

Career 
 Postdoctoral Fellow, Harvard medical School (2002–2005)
 Assistant Professor, University of Washington, Seattle (2005–2010)
 Early Career Scientist, Howard Hughes Medical Institute (2009–2011)
 Associate Professor with Tenure, University of Washington, Seattle (2011)
 Group Leader, Howard Hughes Medical Institute Janelia Research Campus (2011–2017)
 Professor of Biological Chemistry and Physiology, University of California Los Angeles, David Geffen School of Medicine (2017–Present)
 Investigator, Howard Hughes Medical Institute (2017–Present)

Honors 
 First Class Honors in Biological Sciences (University of Auckland, 1998)
 Career Development Award, American Diabetes Association (2009)
 Member, Royal Society of New Zealand (2014)
 Chair, Biophysical Society CryoEM subgroup (2018)
 A.L. Patterson Award from the American Crystallographic Association (2023)

Memberships 

2014 Royal Society of New Zealand

References

External links 
 Gonen laboratory web site
 HHMI Investigator Tamir Gonen

1975 births
American biochemists
Living people
New Zealand biochemists
University of Auckland alumni
University of California, Los Angeles faculty
Harvard Medical School people
University of Washington faculty